Johns Mountain is a summit in the U.S. state of Georgia. The mountain is located inside the Chattahoochee-Oconee National Forest.

Johns Mountain was named in honor of John Fields, a local Cherokee Indian.

References

Mountains of Chattooga County, Georgia
Mountains of Floyd County, Georgia
Mountains of Walker County, Georgia
Mountains of Georgia (U.S. state)